The Azerbaijan Democratic Enlightenment Party (ADMP) is a political party in Azerbaijan.

History
The party was part of the Reform Bloc in the 2005 parliamentary elections. In the 2015 parliamentary elections it nominated one candidate, Elşən Musayev, who was elected in the Zaqatala constituency.

References

Political parties in Azerbaijan
Political parties with year of establishment missing